Deliler is a village in the District of Elmadağ, Ankara Province, Turkey.

References

Villages in Elmadağ District